Patrick Donachie, OAM  (born 24 April 1983 in Sydney, New South Wales)  is an Australian Paralympic swimmer.  He won a gold medal at the 2000 Sydney Games in the Men's 4 × 100 m Freestyle S14 event, for which he received a Medal of the Order of Australia. In 2000, he received an Australian Sports Medal.

References

Male Paralympic swimmers of Australia
Swimmers at the 2000 Summer Paralympics
Paralympic gold medalists for Australia
Recipients of the Medal of the Order of Australia
Recipients of the Australian Sports Medal
Living people
Medalists at the 2000 Summer Paralympics
1983 births
Paralympic medalists in swimming
Australian male freestyle swimmers
S14-classified Paralympic swimmers